is a town located in Sorachi Subprefecture, Hokkaido, Japan.

As of September 2016, the town has an estimated population of 3,134. The total area is 48.55 km2.

Culture

Mascot

She is a farmer cow.

References

External links
Official Website 

Towns in Hokkaido